Donald Ray Massengale Sr. (April 23, 1937 – January 2, 2007) was an American professional golfer who won tournaments on both the PGA Tour and the Senior PGA Tour.

Career
Massengale was born in Jacksboro, Texas. He won the 1958 Texas Amateur Championship. He played collegiately at Texas Christian University and turned pro in 1960.

Massengale's two wins on the PGA Tour came in 1966 and he finished that year 26th on the money list. He finished among the top-60 money winners on the PGA Tour in 1962, 1966 and 1967. His best finish in a major was a 2nd at the 1967 PGA Championship where he lost to Don January in an 18-hole playoff (69-71).

Massengale worked as a club pro in the Houston area in his 40s – between his PGA Tour and Senior PGA Tour careers. He won twice on the Senior PGA Tour (now Champions Tour), the 1990 Greater Grand Rapids Open and the 1992 Royal Caribbean Classic.

Massengale and wife Judy had two sons, Donnie and Mark, both of whom are golf teaching professionals. He also had a younger brother, Rik, who played 13 years on the PGA Tour.

Massengale died of a heart attack in Conroe, Texas.

Amateur wins
1958 Texas Amateur Championship

Professional wins (8)

PGA Tour wins (2)

PGA Tour playoff record (0–1)

Other wins (4)
1972 PGA Club Professional Championship, Westchester Open, Metropolitan Open
1975 Southern Texas PGA Championship

Senior PGA Tour wins (2)

*Note: The 1990 Greater Grand Rapids Open was shortened to 36 holes due to rain.

Senior PGA Tour playoff record (0–1)

Results in major championships

Note: Massengale never played in The Open Championship.

CUT = missed the half-way cut
"T" indicates a tie for a place

U.S. national team appearances
Diamondhead Cup/PGA Cup: 1973 (winners), 1982 (winners)

References

External links

Obituary at PGA Tour.com

American male golfers
TCU Horned Frogs men's golfers
PGA Tour golfers
PGA Tour Champions golfers
Golfers from Texas
People from Jacksboro, Texas
1937 births
2007 deaths